The discography of Swedish-Congolese R&B singer-songwriter and dancer Mohombi consists of two studio albums and eleven singles.

Mohombi collaborated with Swedish rapper Lazee on "Do It", which was released in Sweden on 31 May 2010. It debuted at number nine on the Swedish Singles Chart. In Los Angeles, Mohombi was introduced through friends to producer RedOne, whose own background is Swedish-Moroccan. The singer's debut single, "Bumpy Ride" is the first release on RedOne's label 2101 Records, a joint venture with Universal. It was released in the United States on 24 August 2010. Mohombi released "Miss Me" as his debut single in the United Kingdom on 31 October 2010. It features American rapper Nelly. His third single called "Dirty Situation" was released in Europe on 11 November and features R&B singer Akon. "Dirty Situation" is played at the beginning and then again later on in the middle of the music video for "Miss Me". Mohombi's debut album, MoveMeant was released in Europe Monday 28 February 2011 and was scheduled to be released in the US by the end of 2011. Mohombi features on track "Hula hoop" of the 2011 release of Stella Mwangi album "Kinanda". Mohombi's single, "Coconut Tree" features Nicole Scherzinger.

On 2 September 2011 Mohombi released another single called "Maraca" on iTunes in Sweden. Mohombi also recorded the song "Suave (Kiss Me)" with Pitbull & Nayer. He was nominated for Best Swedish Act at the 2011 European Music Awards in Belfast. This Must Be Pop listed him 7th in their Top 10 of 2012. In 2014, he had a collaborative hit with "I Need Your Love" including charting in the United States with Shaggy, Faydee and Costi.

Albums

Singles

As lead artist

As featured artist

Guest appearances

Writing discography

References

Pop music discographies